Erik Craig Johnson (born December 30, 1989) is an American former professional baseball pitcher. He played in Major League Baseball (MLB) for the Chicago White Sox and San Diego Padres.

Professional career

Chicago White Sox
Johnson played college baseball at University of California, Berkeley and was drafted in the 2nd round by the Chicago White Sox during the 2011 MLB Draft. He started his career with the Rookie-Level Great Falls Voyagers in 2011. He only pitched in two games and two innings during the 2011 season. In 2012, Johnson started the season with Class A Kannapolis Intimidators but was later promoted to Class A-Advanced Winston-Salem Dash. 

Johnson finished the 2012 season with a combined record of 6–5 during 17 starts,  innings, 2.53 ERA, 82 hits, 29 walks and 87 strikeouts. At the start of the 2013 season, Johnson was ranked the White Sox #3 prospect. He started the season at Double-A Birmingham Barons. After going 8–2 in 14 starts,  innings, 2.23 ERA, 57 hits, 21 walks and 74 strikeouts, he was promoted to Triple-A Charlotte Knights.

Johnson made his MLB debut with the White Sox on September 4, 2013.

San Diego Padres
On June 4, 2016, Johnson and Fernando Tatís Jr. were traded to the San Diego Padres in exchange for James Shields. After the trade, he was demoted to AAA but was called up to pitch in the Padres rotation a week later. Through his first four starts with the Padres, Johnson was 0–4 with an ERA of 9.15 while allowing more than four runs in each start. He was placed on the disabled list on July 1. On October 11, 2016, it was announced that Johnson would miss the entire 2017 season after undergoing Tommy John surgery. On December 16, Johnson signed a new minor league contract with the Padres. He elected free agency on November 6, 2017. On March 6, 2018, Johnson resigned a minor league deal with the San Diego Padres. He was assigned to AA San Antonio Missions for the 2018 season, after which he became a free agent.

References

External links

California Golden Bears bio

1989 births
Living people
People from Mountain View, California
Baseball players from California
Major League Baseball pitchers
Chicago White Sox players
San Diego Padres players
California Golden Bears baseball players
Great Falls Voyagers players
Kannapolis Intimidators players
Winston-Salem Dash players
Birmingham Barons players
Charlotte Knights players
San Antonio Missions players
El Paso Chihuahuas players